Çakrazşeyhler or Çakraz is a village in Amasra District, Bartın Province, Turkey. Its population is 332 (2021).

History 
The village has had the same name since 1928.

Geography 
The village is 28 km from Bartın city center and 13 km from Amasra town centre.

See also
 Erythini

References

Villages in Amasra District